The Public Order Act 1936 (1 Edw. 8 & 1 Geo. 6 c. 6) is an Act of the Parliament of the United Kingdom passed to control extremist political movements in the 1930s such as the British Union of Fascists (BUF).

Largely the work of Home Office civil servant Frank Newsam, the Act banned the wearing of political uniforms in any public place or public meeting. (The first conviction under the Act was of William Henry Wood, by Leeds Magistrates' Court on 27 January 1937.) It also required police consent for political marches to go ahead (now covered by the Public Order Act 1986). The Act also prohibited organising, training or equipping an "association of persons ... for the purpose of enabling them to be employed in usurping the functions of the police or of the armed forces of the Crown", or "for the use or display of physical force in promoting any political object".

While the Act likely prevented a rapid comeback of the BUF, it may in fact have had the indirect result of actually improving their fortunes. The party's forced abandonment of paramilitary and armed tactics improved their relations with the police and, by making it more "respectable", increased the BUF appeal among traditionally conservative middle-class citizens, who became the party's main base in the years after the Public Order Act 1936 was passed.

The Act was used extensively against IRA and Sinn Féin demonstrations in the 1970s, though the Act does not extend to Northern Ireland. In November 1974, 12 people were each fined the maximum £50 under the Act for wearing black berets at Speakers' Corner during a Sinn Féin anti-internment rally.

The Public Order Act 1936 was also used extensively against the flying pickets during the 1984/5 miners' strike. The police used it on the grounds of preventing a breach of the peace. In 2015 and 2016, this act has also been used against Paul Golding and Jayda Fransen of the far-right political movement Britain First.

Section 5 - Conduct conducive to breach of the peace
This section created the offence of conduct conducive to breach of the peace. This section was repealed by section 40(3) of, and Schedule 3 to, the Public Order Act 1986. The offence under this section was abolished by section 9(2)(d) of that Act.

The offence under this section is replaced by the offence of fear or provocation of violence, contrary to section 4 of the Public Order Act 1986.

See also
Public Order Act

References

External links



Anti-fascism in the United Kingdom
Fascism in the United Kingdom
United Kingdom Acts of Parliament 1936